The Devon Meadows Football Netball Club, nicknamed the Panthers, is an Amateur Australian rules football and netball club based in Devon Meadows, Victoria. The football team currently competes in the Mornington Peninsula Nepean Football League (MPNFL) and was established in 1977.

History
The club competed in their first season in the South West Gippsland Football League in 1979. That league merged with the Mornington Peninsula Nepean Football League (MPNFL) in 1995.

The Seniors, Reserves and Under 19s currently play in the Nepean Division of Mornington Peninsula Nepean Football League (MPNFL) since moving from Casey-Cardinia Division in 2012.  While the Juniors play in the Mornington Peninsula Junior Football League.

Current Grounds, Teams and Leagues
The senior team is coached by Glenn Michie.
The reserves team is coached by John Percy.
The under 19s is coached by Luke Harris.
There are currently 12 Teams Competing for Devon Meadows ranging from Auskick all the way up to Seniors as there is one team for every junior age group excluding U/10's who have two teams,

The traditional ground for the team is Glover Recreation Reserve, located on Browns Road in Devon Meadows. The ground is 5 minutes from the Botanic Ridge & Settlers Run estates.
 
Whilst the ground was being upgraded to its current quality surface, the Seniors, Reserves and Under 19s sometimes played games at the E.G Allen Oval located in the centre of nearby Cranbourne at the Racecourse, which is only a 5-minute drive from Devon Meadows

Club song 
Panther Land
(to the tune of the Richmond Football Club Song)

Oh we're from Panther Land  The Mighty football team from Panther Land  In any weather you will see us with a grin  Risking head and chin  We'll fight and fight until we drop  and then we'll fight again  Oh we're from Panther Land  We're never beaten till' the final sirens gone  Oh we're the Panthers of old  We're strong and we're bold  Oh we're from Panther  Red, white and black  Oh we're from Panther Land

Premierships and Titles
The Seniors have not won a premiership.

The most Recent Premierships for the club have been:

 2015 - Reserves
 2009 - U/16's
 2008 - U/13's and U/14's

References

External links 
 Official website

Australian rules football clubs in Victoria (Australia)
1979 establishments in Australia
Mornington Peninsula Nepean Football League
Netball teams in Victoria (Australia)
Sport in the City of Casey